Dustdar is a surname. Notable people with the surname include:

Aramesh Dustdar (1931–2021), Iranian philosopher, writer, and scholar
Schahram Dustdar, Austrian computer scientist
Ehsanollah Khan Dustdar (1884–1939), Iranian activist and political activist executed in Moscow